Pedapadu mandal is one of the 28 mandals in Eluru district of the Indian state of Andhra Pradesh having population of 76,793 as of 2011 census. It is administered under Eluru revenue division and its headquarters are located at Pedapadu.

Towns and villages 

 census, the mandal has 23 settlements. Vatluru is the most populated and Edulakunta is the least populated village in the mandal.

The settlements in the mandal are listed below:

See also 
List of mandals in Andhra Pradesh

References

Mandals in Eluru district